Anatoma crispata is a species of minute sea snail, a marine gastropod mollusk or micromollusk in the family Anatomidae.

Description
The length of the shell varies between 1 mm and 4 mm. The globose, pearly white shell slopes toward the periphery. It is delicate, semitransparent, and glossy. The sculpture consists of numerous fine, curved, longitudinal ribs, interrupted by the slit fasciole, closer on the base, intersected by minute spiral striae in the interstices. The thin epidermis is caducous, and pale yellowish-brown. The spire is usually rather depressed, but variable. The four ;
whorls are flattened above, rapidly enlarging. The slit is long and narrow, nearly central. The slit fasciole is deep, striated across. The edges are 
somewhat thick, sharp, and prominent . The rounded aperture is oblique. The peristome is continuous. The outer lip is thin. The inner lip is folded back on the columella. The umbilicus is deep, but exposing only the body whorl. The operculum is very delicate, with numerous whorls, the last large.

Distribution
This species has a wide distribution. It occurs in circumarctic waters (Greenland, Canada, Baffin Island, Queen Elisabeth Islands, Labrador), in European waters, the Mediterranean Sea, in the Atlantic Ocean off the Azores, Cape Verde, Angola; in the Northwest Atlantic Ocean (Florida, the Bahamas), in the West Indies, in the Pacific Ocean off California and Japan.

This species has been cited from multiple localities throughout the North Atlantic, but most records are inaccurate due to confusion with Anatoma aspera (mostly), A. tenuisculpta and A. orbiculata. Therefore, records which are not backed by an illustration or a specimen should be disregarded.

References

 Geiger, D.L. (2012). Monograph of the little slit shells. Volume 1. Introduction, Scissurellidae. pp. 1–728. Volume 2. Anatomidae, Larocheidae, Depressizonidae, Sutilizonidae, Temnocinclidae. pp. 729–1291. Santa Barbara Museum of Natural History Monographs. Number 7

External links
 
 Fleming, J. (1828). A history of British animals, exhibiting the descriptive characters and systematical arrangement of the genera and species of quadrupeds, birds, reptiles, fishes, Mollusca, and Radiata of the United Kingdom; including the indigenous, extirpated, and extinct kinds, together with periodical and occasional visitants. Edinburgh, Bell & Bradfute / London, James Duncan. Pp. i–xxii, 1–565
 Høisæter T. & Geiger D.L. (2011) Species of Anatoma (Gastropoda: Anatomidae) in Norwegian and adjacent waters, with the description of two new species. The Nautilus 125(3): 89–112
 Lovén, S. L. (1846). Index Molluscorum litora Scandinaviae occidentalia habitantium. Öfversigt af Kongliga Vetenskaps Akademiens Förhandlingar. (1846): 134–160, 182–204
 Micali P. & Geiger D.L. (2015). Additions and corrections to the Scissurellidae and Anatomidae (Gastropoda Vetigastropoda) of the Mediterranean Sea, with first record of Sinezona semicostata Burnay et Rolán, 1990. Biodiversity Journal. 6(3): 703–708
 Nekhaev, I. O.; Krol, E. N. (2020). A review of the genus Anatoma in the Eurasian Arctic seas (Gastropoda: Vetigastropoda: Anatomidae). Zoosystematica Rossica, (Zoosyst. Rossica). 29(1): 128–137

Anatomidae
Gastropods described in 1828
Molluscs of the Atlantic Ocean
Molluscs of the Pacific Ocean
Molluscs of the Mediterranean Sea